Martine Fays (born 3 August 1959) is a French distance runner who competed mainly in the 3000 metres and cross country running events. She made eight appearances for France at the IAAF World Cross Country Championships between 1982 and 1991. She won three women's team medals (two silver and one bronze), running alongside compatriots Annette Sergent, Anne Viallix, Jacqueline Lefeuvre, Maria Lelut and Marie-Pierre Duros. Her best individual finish at the competition was fourth at the 1986 race, where she was pipped to the bronze by teammate Sergent.

On the track, Fays set a French national record in the 3000 m with a run of 8:46.18 minutes (a lifetime best) at the 1987 Meeting Nikaïa. She ranked in the top twenty runners for that event in the 1987 season and 1989 season. She was a finalist in the 3000 m at the European Athletics Championships in 1986 and 1990, though never made the top ten, and ran in the heats of the 1987 World Championships in Athletics.

Born in Vinay, Isère, she competed for France internationally 19 times. She was a member of three clubs during her career: Grenoble UC up to 1987, then Individuelle Dauphinée-Savoie in 1988, and finally ASPTT Grenoble from 1989 onwards. She won one national title during her career, winning the 1500 metres at the French Athletics Championships in 1983. In professional road running, she was a three-time winner of the Paris-Versailles Race and won the 1992 Chris McKinnon Memorial Race.

International competitions

National titles
French Athletics Championships
1500 m: 1983

References

External links

1959 births
Living people
Sportspeople from Isère
French female middle-distance runners
French female long-distance runners
French female cross country runners
World Athletics Championships athletes for France